Eric Crumble (born December 10, 1966) is an American former boxer, and notably one of the sport's most prolific in terms of consistent losses. Since his professional debut on June 22, 1990, Crumble has participated in 32 fights and has lost every one with the exception of a no contest in 1994. Additionally, all of his losses have occurred via knockout in either the first or second round.

In thirteen years of boxing, Crumble has fought in six weight classes, with his most notable opponents being Angel Manfredy in 1993 and Antwun Echols in 1996, both of whom went on to win regional and national championships, including challenging for world championships.

Crumble resides in Milwaukee, Wisconsin.

Professional boxing record

External links

Living people
1966 births
Place of birth missing (living people)

Super-middleweight boxers
American male boxers